Pusht-e-Koh is a district in Farah province, Afghanistan. Its population, which is 70% Pashtun and 30% Tajik, was estimated at 35,000 in January 2005.

References
 UNHCR District Profile, compiled December 2004–January 2005, accessed 2006-06-19 (PDF).

Districts of Farah Province